Siositina Hakeai (born 1 March 1994) is a New Zealand athlete. She was New Zealand women's discus champion for three years from 2012 to 2014. Hakeai placed fourth in the women's discus throw at both the 2014 Commonwealth Games and the 2018 Commonwealth Games.

Personal bests

Competition record

References

External links

New Zealand female discus throwers
Athletes (track and field) at the 2014 Commonwealth Games
Athletes (track and field) at the 2018 Commonwealth Games
People from Auckland
1994 births
Living people
World Athletics Championships athletes for New Zealand
Commonwealth Games competitors for New Zealand